Gábor Nemes (born 30 November 1964) is a Hungarian water polo player. His team placed sixth in the men's tournament at the 1992 Summer Olympics.

See also
 Hungary men's Olympic water polo team records and statistics
 List of men's Olympic water polo tournament goalkeepers
 List of World Aquatics Championships medalists in water polo

References

External links
 

1964 births
Living people
Hungarian male water polo players
Water polo goalkeepers
Olympic water polo players of Hungary
Water polo players at the 1992 Summer Olympics
Water polo players from Budapest
20th-century Hungarian people